Kanne Radha is a 1982 Indian Tamil-language film directed by Rama Narayanan, starring Radha and Vanitha, with Karthik and Raja in supporting roles . This film was dubbed into Telugu as Radha Madhavi and released on 29 November 1985.

Plot

Radha (Radha) is the daughter of Su. So. Vi. Sokkalingam (Thengai Srinivasan), an influential businessman. Being a mischievous  girl, she bunks classes with her cousin Geetha (Vanitha) to watch movies. On one such incident Radha acts like she is pregnant, simply to get a free ride to the theatre. Radha and her friends run into Raja (Karthik), a taxi driver, who is forced to drop the "pregnant woman" to the hospital. However, he then realises that she fooled him, but is impressed by her antics. Raja saves up money for the treatment of his doting elder sister, Vadivu (Vadivukkarasi), a blind woman. He later meets his long time friend Nataraj and joins as a driver in his house after saving Nataraj's father from some goons.

Raja and Radha keep running into each other, and he finally declares his love for her. The latter gladly agrees though she is unaware of his background. On the other hand, Nataraj who has fallen in love with Geetha, requests Raja to go in place of him and reject the bride his father has seen for him. A reluctant Raja goes to the girl's house posing to be Nataraj, only to find out that the girl is none other than Radha. Dumbstruck yet overjoyed, Raja readily agrees and the wedding gets fixed. Nataraj pretends to be Raja's driver in order to marry Geetha. Before the wedding, Vadivu successfully undergoes eye transplantation. But to Raja's dismay, she forbids him to marry Radha. On being questioned she relates how many years back, Sokkalingam had married but abandoned her the next day. Raja however insists that he use his marriage to exact revenge for his sister's situation.

After the wedding he refuses to accept Radha as his wife, leaving the marriage incomplete. This causes much heartache to Radha and her family. Their relationship is further broken when Raja's true identity (of being a taxi driver) is revealed, and Radha's parents insult him time and time again. Later, Sokkalingam offers him money to leave the house, to which Raja agrees. However he had other plans and accepted the money just to bring out Sokkalingam's atrocities. Deep down, Raja loves Radha and is waiting for the right time to tell her the reasons behind his actions. But she is heartbroken thinking that Raja loved her only for her money.

Why did Raja accept Sokkalingam's bribe? Will Sokkalingam realize his mistake and accept Vadivu? Will Radha ever realize Raja's true love for her? Will they reunite? This forms the intriguing second half of the story.

Cast
Radha as Radha
Vanitha as Geetha 
Karthik as Raja 
V. K. Ramasamy as Siva gurunathan 
Thengai Srinivasan as Chockalingam 
Vadivukkarasi as Raja Sister Vadivu
Raja as Nataraj
Gundu Kalyanam as Cook 
Ramarajan as Uncredited
 Vasantha

Soundtrack

The soundtrack was composed by Ilaiyaraaja.

Tamil Version

Telugu Version 

Lyrics in Telugu dubbed version Radha Madhavi were written by Rajasri and music was released through ECHO.

References

External links

1982 films
Films scored by Ilaiyaraaja
Films directed by Rama Narayanan
1980s Tamil-language films
Films set in Tiruchirappalli